Lao sausage, also known as Laotian sausage or sai oua (also sai ua), refers to a popular type of Lao sausage made from coarsely chopped fatty pork seasoned with lemongrass, galangal, kaffir lime leaves, shallots, cilantro, chillies, garlic, salt, sticky rice and fish sauce.  Lao sausage is a broad term used to describe the local variant of Lao style sausages found in Laos, Northern and Northeastern Thailand.

Sai oua is an ancient Lao word for sausage, literally sai (intestine) oua (stuffed). Sai oua is a spicy sausage originating from Luang Prabang, Laos. Luang Prabang was once the royal capital and seat of power of the Kingdom of Lan Xang (1353-1707). The ancient city of Luang Prabang is considered to be the cradle of Lao culture and cuisine. At the height of its power, Luang Prabang's influence stretches from the borders of Sipsongpanna (China) to Steung Treng (Cambodia), from the eastern border along the Annamite Range with Vietnam to the western border Khorat Plateau (Northeastern Thailand (Isan)) and its sister kingdom of Lan Na

Types 
There are two types of Sai oua in Laos.
 Sai oua moo or pork sausage, literally sai (intestine) oua (stuffed) moo (pork). The traditional recipe for sai oua moo served to Laotian royalties can be found in a collection of hand written recipes from Phia Sing (1898-1967), the king's personal chef and master of ceremonies. Phia Sing's hand written recipes were compiled and published for the first time in 1981.
 Sai oua kwai or water buffalo sausage, literally sai (intestine) oua (stuffed) kwai (water buffalo)

Similar sausages 
Sausages in Lao cuisine include sai gork ("soured Lao sausage"), "sai gork wan" (sweet sausage), and "sai gork leuat" (blood sausage), naem (sour sausage) and "mam" (beef liver sausage).

See also

 Sai gork
 List of sausages

References

External links
 Sai Ua Moo (pork sausage) recipe
Tum Mak Houng, Ping Pa, Sai Ua

Lao sausages